Chersonesia intermedia, the Intermediate Maplet, is an Indomalayan butterfly of the family Nymphalidae (Cyrestinae). It is found from Assam to Peninsular Malaya then to Sumatra and  Borneo.

References

External links
Images from Butterflies in Indo-China

Cyrestinae
Butterflies described in 1895